"Bed of Roses" is a song by the American alternative-rock group Screaming Trees. It is the first single released in support of their fifth album, Uncle Anesthesia. The song made number thirty-two on John Sellers' "The 100 Most Underrated Indie Rock Songs" list.

Formats and track listing 
All songs written by Gary Lee Conner, Van Conner and Mark Lanegan.
US CD single (ESK 2296)
"Bed of Roses" – 3:35

Charts

Personnel
Adapted from the Bed of Roses liner notes.

Screaming Trees
 Gary Lee Conner – electric guitar, backing vocals
 Van Conner – bass guitar, backing vocals
 Mark Lanegan – lead vocals
 Mark Pickerel – drums, percussion

Production and additional personnel
 Chris Cornell – production
 Terry Date – production, engineering, percussion
 Joe Gastwirt – mastering
 Screaming Trees – production

Release history

References

External links 
 

1990 songs
1991 singles
Screaming Trees songs
Song recordings produced by Chris Cornell
Song recordings produced by Terry Date
Songs written by Gary Lee Conner
Songs written by Van Conner
Songs written by Mark Lanegan
Epic Records singles